Mathiyampatti lake is located northeast of Mathiyampatti village of Vennandur block in Namakkl district of Tamil Nadu, India.

References

Lakes of Tamil Nadu
Namakkal district